Alice Graham Underhill (born March 8, 1946) was a Democratic member of the North Carolina General Assembly, representing the state's third House district from 2001 to 2003 and again from 2005 until 2011. She was defeated for re-election in 2010 by Norman W. Sanderson.

References

External links
NC General Assembly official profile
Project Vote Smart profile 
Follow the Money - Alice Graham Underhill
2008 2006 2004 2002 2000 campaign contributions

|-

Democratic Party members of the North Carolina House of Representatives
Living people
Women state legislators in North Carolina
1946 births
21st-century American politicians
21st-century American women politicians